Younes El Aynaoui was the defending champion but did not compete that year.

Unseeded David Ferrer won in the final 6–3, 6–2 against José Acasuso.

Seeds
A champion seed is indicated in bold text while text in italics indicates the round in which that seed was eliminated.

Draw

References
 Singles draw
 Singles qualifying draw

Romanian Open
Singles
2002 in Romanian tennis